Little Torch Key is an island in the lower Florida Keys.

U.S. Route 1 (also known as the Overseas Highway), crosses the key at about mile markers 28–29. It is immediately preceded to the northeast by Big Pine Key, and is followed by Middle Torch Key to the southwest.

A small island  from Key West, Little Torch Key is home primarily to locals, living and working from Big Pine Key to Key West.  The island is also host to visitors who don't mind a commute to the popular destination of Key West. There are a few, but not many businesses on the island, including restaurants and lodging.

Like all of the keys in the Torch Keys, this key was probably named for the native torchwood tree, Amyris elemifera L.  The north end of the key is the site of a former settlement which was abandoned in 1938 when the highway was relocated.

Its most likely claim to fame is as a relatively frequent fishing destination for U.S. President Harry S. Truman.  A Reuters story on February 14, 2009, named a resort there as one of the "Top 10 most romantic retreats".

Etymology
Little Torch Key was named after the torchwood tree and is just south of Big Pine Key.

References

Islands of the Florida Keys
Islands of Monroe County, Florida
Islands of Florida